Virginia is an unincorporated community in Bates County, in the U.S. state of Missouri.

History
Virginia was platted in 1871, and named after Virginia, the native home of a share of the first settlers. A post office was established at Virginia in 1871, and remained in operation until 1906.

References

Unincorporated communities in Bates County, Missouri
Unincorporated communities in Missouri